The Roman Catholic Diocese of Caacupé is a Latin rite suffragan diocese in the Ecclesiastical province of Archdiocese of Asunción, which covers all and only Paraguay.

Its cathedral episcopal see is a Minor Basilica and National Shrine: Catedral Basílica Nuestra Señora de los Milagros, dedicated to Our Lady of Miracles, in the city of Caacupé, in Cordillera Department.

History 
 On 2 August 1960, the Territorial Prelature of Caacupé was established on territories split off from the Archdiocese of Asunción (still its Metropolitan) and from the Diocese of Concepción
 Promoted on 29 March 1967 as Diocese of Caacupé
 It enjoyed Papal visits from Pope John Paul II in May 1988 and Pope Francis in July 2015.

Statistics 
As per 2014, it pastorally served 262,724 Catholics (93.0% of 282,481 total) on 4,984 km² in 20 parishes and 2 missions with 29 priests (24 diocesan, 5 religious), 2 deacons, 44 lay religious (7 brothers, 37 sisters), 6 seminarians.

Bishops 
(all Roman Rite)

Ordinaries
Territorial Prelate of Caacupé 
 Bishop-Prelate Ismael Blas Rolón Silvero, Salesians (S.D.B.) (August 2, 1960 – March 29, 1967 see below), Titular Bishop of Fornos Major (1965.10.20 – 1967.03.29)

Suffragan Bishops of Caacupé 
 Ismael Blas Rolón Silvero, (S.D.B.) (see above March 29, 1967 – June 16, 1970), later Metropolitan Archbishop of Asunción (Paraguay) (1970.06.16 – retired 1989.05.20), President of Episcopal Conference of Paraguay (1985 – 1989), died 2010
 Demetrio Ignacio Aquino Aquino (June 12, 1971 – retired November 1, 1994), died 2003
''Apostolic Administrator Eustaquio Pastor Cuquejo Verga, Redemptorists (C.SS.R.) (1994.11 – 1995.06.03), Titular Bishop of Ofena (1992.05.05 – 1998.03.07), while Military Ordinary of Paraguay (1992.05.05 – 2002.06.15), later Metropolitan Archbishop of Asunción (Paraguay) (2002.06.15 – retired 2014.11.06), President of Episcopal Conference of Ecuador (2008.04 – 2011)
 Catalino Claudio Giménez Medina (June 3, 1995.06.03 – 29 June 2017), also President of Episcopal Conference of Paraguay (2002 – 2005 & 2011.11 – ...); previously Titular Bishop of Horæa (1991.11.08 – 1995.06.03) as Auxiliary Bishop of Archdiocese of Asunción (Paraguay) (1991.11.08 – 1995.06.03)
 Ricardo Jorge Valenzuela Ríos (29 June 2017 – ...), previously Titular Bishop of Casæ Calanæ (1993.11.27 – 2003.05.24) as Auxiliary Bishop of Archdiocese of Asunción (Paraguay) (1993.11.27 – 2003.05.24), Military Ordinary of Paraguay (2003.05.24 – 2010.06.25), Bishop of Villarrica (Paraguay) (2010.06.25 – 2017.06.29), Apostolic Administrator of Diocese of Ciudad del Este (Paraguay) (2014.09.25 – 2014.11.15), Vice-President of Episcopal Conference of Paraguay (2015.11.03 – ...).

Other priests of this diocese who became bishops
Juan Bautista Gavilán Velásquez, appointed Bishop of Concepción (Santissima Concezione) en Paraguay in 1994
Miguel Ángel Cabello Almada, appointed Bishop of Concepción (Santissima Concezione) en Paraguay in 2013

Sources and external links
 GCatholic.org, with incumbent biography links - data for all sections
 Catholic Hierarchy

Roman Catholic dioceses in Paraguay
Roman Catholic Ecclesiastical Province of Asunción
Roman Catholic dioceses and prelatures established in the 20th century
Cordillera Department
Religious organizations established in 1960
1960 establishments in Paraguay